Maksym Timchenko (also spelled Maxim Timchenko and Maksym Tymchenko; ; born 12 August 1975, in the town of Novoselitsy, Novgorod oblast) is chief executive officer of DTEK. He has headed the company since its foundation in 2005.

Timchenko is a member of the Electricity Governors community, which brings together business leaders and partner organizations from the World Economic Forum.

Education 
Timchenko graduated with honours from the Donetsk State Academy of Management, majoring in Production Management. He continued his education at the University of Manchester, where he obtained a diploma with honours and a Bachelor of Arts degree in Economic and Social Studies.

In 2011, he successfully completed the joint Executive Development Programme – Energy of a Leader – run by the DTEK Academy and the London Business School. He is a member of the Association of Chartered Certified Accountants (ACCA).

Career 
Maksym Timchenko started his career in 1999 at PricewaterhouseCoopers, where he was promoted from consultant to lead auditor. Between 2002 and 2005, he worked as a senior manager at SCM; he supervised the work of SCM's energy business until it spun off into DTEK.

Managing DTEK 
Timchenko has been DTEK's chief executive officer since its founding in July 2005. He promoted the establishment of a vertically-integrated chain of companies within the SCM Group. DTEK’s subsidiaries operate in the areas of coal mining, and electricity generation and distribution, which allowed the company to overcome the 2008 global economic crisis. The vertical integration provided the company with necessary financial security and development opportunities, even in adverse conditions. To date, DTEK is Ukraine's leading and biggest private investor in the energy sector, and its subsidiaries are involved in coal and natural gas extraction; electricity generation from wind, solar, and thermal power plants; energy resources trading in national and international markets; distributing and supplying electricity to consumers; providing energy efficiency services to customers; and developing high-speed charging station networks. In each of DTEK's distinct business areas, production companies are merged into operating holding companies. According to Deloitte, DTEK is among the top ten most dynamic companies in Central and Eastern Europe.

In 2020, Timchenko presented DTEK's new 2030 strategy, based on ESG principles, as well as plans and actions for DTEK's transformation into a modern digital company.

DTEK is among the leaders in Ukrainian Companies’ Transparency Index 2020.

Social activity 
Since 2019, Timchenko has been a member of the UN Global Compact on Ukraine's Supervisory Board. He leads Academy DTEK's MBA project commission, suggesting non-standard formats for training projects, as well as developing Ukraine's educational ecosystem.

Awards 

 Ranked in the top ten in the TOP-100. Best Top Managers of Ukraine 2010 rating of the publishing house Ekonomika
 Best top manager of Ukraine in the nomination Change Management in the Organisation 2010  in the TOP-100 rating of the publishing house Ekonomika
 Best top manager of Ukraine in the Energy 2012-2013 category in the TOP-100 rating of the publishing house Ekonomika
 Best top manager of Ukraine in the M&A Leader 2013 nomination in the TOP-100 rating of the publishing house Ekonomika
 Ranked in the top ten of the 25 Best СЕО rating of Forbes Украина
 In 2021 topped the rating of the best managers in Ukraine according to the magazine "TOP 100. Ratings of the largest"

Publications 

 The Future of the Ukrainian Energy Sector. Interview with Maxim Timchenko, the CEO at DTEK
 Interview with DTEK's CEO Maxim Timchenko to RBC Ukraine
 DTEK CEO Maxim Timchenko: Directionless Lobbying is not the way to create a business (RBC)
 Mounting crisis: The DTEK story, as told by Maxim Timchenko (Kyiv Post)
 Ukraine must work with leading nations to build sustainable energy markets (WEF)
 Maxim Timchenko: Environmental, social and corporate governance — the new bedrock for business (Kyiv Post)
 Maxim Timchenko: Energy for a new Ukraine (Kyiv Post)

References

External links 

DTEK’s official website
DTEK at Facebook
DTEK at Twitter

1975 births
Living people
People from Novgorod Oblast
Alumni of the University of Manchester
Donetsk State University of Management alumni